Edgington v Fitzmaurice (1885) 29 Ch D 459 is an English contract law case, concerning misrepresentation. It holds that a statement of present intentions can count as an actionable misrepresentation and that a misrepresentation need not be the sole cause of entering a contract so long as it is an influence.

Facts
Company directors sent shareholders a prospectus inviting subscriptions for debenture bonds. It said money would go to alter their buildings, buy horses, vans and expand into supplying fish. Really though, the purpose was to pay off liabilities, because the company was in trouble. Mistakenly believing he would get a first charge on company property, Mr Edgington bought bonds. If he was aware that he wouldn't get a charge, he wouldn't have done so. Mr Edgington sought to recover money for deceit.

Judgment
The Court of Appeal upheld Denman J at first instance, saying that the directors were liable for deceit. Cotton LJ held that the statement of purpose was a fraudulent misrepresentation and Mr Edgington had relied on that despite his admission of mistake over charges. He said,

To fulfil the requirement that Mr Edgington relied on the statement, it is not necessary to show the misstatement was the sole cause of acting, so long as there was an influence.

Bowen LJ said ‘the state of a man’s mind is as much a fact as the state of his digestion... A misrepresentation as to the state of a man’s mind is, therefore, a misstatement of fact... such misstatement was material if it was actively present to his mind when he decided to advance his money.’

Fry LJ said the ‘inquiry is whether this statement materially affected the conduct of the Plaintiff in advancing his money.’ He pointed out the ‘prospectus was intended to influence the mind of the reader.’

See also

English contract law
Misrepresentation in English law

Notes

United Kingdom company case law
English misrepresentation case law
Court of Appeal (England and Wales) cases
1885 in case law
1885 in British law